Taher Kaboutari (born 1985) is an athlete who competes for the Islamic Republic of Iran in rowing. 
Taher Kaboutari competed in the 2010 Asian Games representing Iran.

Competitive appearances
16th Annual Asian Games, Guangzhou 2010

External links
 
 NBC 2008 Olympics profile

1985 births
Living people
Iranian male rowers
Rowers at the 2010 Asian Games
Asian Games competitors for Iran